Edwin Kent Clarke (born 21 January 1932, died 25 October 2016) was a Canadian Anglican bishop.

Clarke was educated at Bishop's University and ordained in 1957. He was a curate of All Saints' Westboro until 1956 when he became Director of Christian Education for the Diocese of Ottawa, a position he held until 1966. He was rector of St Lambert, Montreal from then until 1973 when he became diocesan secretary of the Diocese of Niagara and Archdeacon  of Niagara. He was Bishop Suffragan of Niagara from  1976 to 1979 and Bishop of Edmonton from 1980 to 1986. He became Archbishop of Edmonton and Metropolitan of Rupert's Land in that year but resigned a year later.

References 

1932 births
Bishop's University alumni
Anglican Church of Canada archdeacons
20th-century Anglican Church of Canada bishops
Anglican bishops of Edmonton
20th-century Anglican archbishops
Metropolitans of Rupert's Land
1994 deaths